The 2014 NCAA Men's Water Polo Championship was the 46th annual NCAA Men's Water Polo Championship to determine the national champion of NCAA men's collegiate water polo. Tournament matches were played at UC San Diego's Canyonview Aquatic Center, La Jolla, California from December 6–7, 2014. UCLA defeated USC 9–8 to win the National Championship, its ninth NCAA men's water polo title and 112th NCAA title in school history. Danny McClintick was named the NCAA Tournament MVP.

Qualification
Since there has only ever been one single national championship for water polo, all NCAA men's water polo programs (whether from Division I, Division II, or Division III) were eligible. Under the new format, six teams were invited to contest this single-elimination tournament.

Bracket

See also 
 NCAA Men's Water Polo Championship
 NCAA Women's Water Polo Championship

Notes
 UCLA – Sophomores Garrett Danner and Gordon Marshall joined McClintick on the NCAA's All-Tournament First Team. Seniors Cristiano Mirarchi and Paul Reynolds were both named to the Second Team.
 UCLA Saves – Garrett Danner 9
 USC Saves – McQuin Baron 6

References

2014 in American sports
2014 in water polo
2014 in sports in California
NCAA Men's Water Polo Championship
December 2014 sports events in the United States